A tribal council is an association of First Nations bands in Canada, generally along regional, ethnic or linguistic lines.

An Indian band, usually consisting of one main community, is the fundamental unit of government for First Nations in Canada. Bands may unite to form a tribal council, but they need not do so. Bands that do not belong to a tribal council are said to be independent. Bands may and do withdraw from tribal councils. Furthermore, the authority that bands delegate to their tribal council varies, with some tribal councils serving as a strong, central organization while others are granted limited power by their members.

Nunavut and Newfoundland and Labrador do not have any tribal councils.

Tribal councils in Canada

Alberta

, Alberta has ten tribal councils:
Athabasca Tribal Council — Athabasca Chipewyan, Chipewyan Prairie, Fort McKay, and Fort McMurray #468
Blackfoot Confederacy — Blood (aka Kainai), Piikani, and Siksika
Kee Tas Kee Now Tribal Council — Loon River Cree, Lubicon Lake, Peerless Trout, Whitefish Lake, and Woodland Cree
Lesser Slave Lake Indian Regional Council — Driftpile Cree, Kapawe'no, Sawridge, Sucker Creek, and Swan River
Maskwacis Cree Tribal Council — Ermineskin Tribe, Louis Bull, Montana, and Samson
North Peace Tribal Council — Beaver, Dene Tha', Little Red River Cree, and Tallcree Tribal Government
Stoney-Nakoda - Tsuut'ina Tribal Council — Chiniki and Tsuut'ina Nation
Tribal Chiefs Ventures — Beaver Lake Cree, Cold Lake, Frog Lake, Heart Lake, and Kehewin Cree
Western Cree Tribal Council — Duncan's, Horse Lake, and Sturgeon Lake Cree
Yellowhead Tribal Council — Alexander, Alexis Nakota Sioux, O'Chiese, and Sunchild

British Columbia

Northern Shuswap Tribal Council (aka Cariboo Tribal Council)
Carrier Chilcotin Tribal Council
Carrier Sekani Tribal Council
Kaska Tribal Council
Kwakiutl District Council
Lillooet Tribal Council (aka St'at'imc Nation, but does not include all St'at'imc)
Lower Stl'atl'imx Tribal Council (formerly In-SHUCK-ch) — Douglas, Lil'wat, N'Quatqua, Samahquam, and Skatin
Musgamagw Tsawataineuk Tribal Council
Naut'sa mawt Tribal Council
Nicola Tribal Association — Nlaka'pamux and Okanagan
Nisga'a Tribal Council
Nlaka'pamux Nation Tribal Council (does not include all Nlaka'pamux)
Northern Shuswap Tribal Council
Nuu-chah-nulth Tribal Council
Office of the Wet'suwet'en
Okanagan Nation Alliance (includes Colville Reservation in US)
Shuswap Nation Tribal Council
Sto:lo Nation
Stó:lō Tribal Council
Tsilhqot'in National Government
Treaty 8 Tribal Association (northeastern BC)

Defunct
Fraser Canyon Indian Administration — Nlaka'pamux
Tsimshian Tribal Council

Manitoba

, Manitoba has eight tribal councils:
Anishinaabe Agowidiiwinan Secretariat
Dakota Ojibway Tribal Council — Birdtail Sioux, Dakota Tipi, Long Plain, Roseau River Anishnabe, Sandy Bay Ojibway, Swan Lake, and Waywayseecappo 
Interlake Reserves Tribal Council — Dauphin River, Kinonjeoshtegon, Lake Manitoba, Little Saskatchewan, Peguis, and Pinaymootang
Island Lake Tribal Council — Garden Hill, Red Sucker, St. Theresa Point, and Wasagamack
Keewatin Tribal Council — Barren Lands, Bunibonibee Cree, Fox Lake Cree, God's Lake, Manto Sipi Cree, Northlands Denesuline, Sayisi Dene, Shamattawa, Tataskweyak Cree, War Lake, and York Factory
Southeast Resource Development Council —  Berens River, Black River, Bloodvein, Brokenhead, Hollow Water, Little Grand Rapids, Pauingassi, and Poplar River (and formerly Buffalo Point)
Swampy Cree Tribal Council — Chemawawin Cree, Mathias Colomb, Misipawistik Cree, Mosakahiken Cree, Opaskwayak Cree, Sapotaweyak Cree, and Wuskwi Sipihk
West Region Tribal Council — Ebb and Flow, Gambler, Keeseekoowenin, O-Chi-Chak-Ko-Sipi, Pine Creek, Rolling River, Skownan, and Tootinaowaziibeeng Treaty Reserve
Manitoba Keewatinook Ininew Okimowin (MKO), though not a tribal council, represents citizens of 26 First Nations who are signatories to Treaties 4, 5, 6, and 10.

Northwest Territories
, the Northwest Territories has five tribal councils:
Akaitcho Territory Government — Deninu Kųę́, Łutsël K'é Dene, Salt River, and Yellowknives Dene
Dehcho First Nations — Acho Dene Koe, Deh Gáh Got'ı̨ę, Jean Marie River, K'atlodeeche, Ka'a'gee Tu, Łı́ı́dlı̨ı̨ Kų́ę́, Nahanni Butte, Pehdzeh Ki, Sambaa K'e, and West Point
Gwich'in Tribal Council — Aklavik, Gwichya Gwich'in, Inuvik Native, and Teetl'it Gwich'in Band Council
Sahtu Dene Council — Behdzi Ahda', Délı̨nę, Fort Good Hope, and Tulita Dene
Tetlit Gwich'in Council DGO

Atlantic Canada

, Atlantic Canada has a collective total of nine tribal councils, with Newfoundland and Labrador having no tribal councils at all.

New Brunswick

Mawiw Council — Elsipogtog, Esgenoopetitj, and Tobique
North Shore Micmac District Council — Buctouche MicMac, Eel Ground, Eel River Bar, Fort Folly, Indian Island, Metepenagiag Mi'kmaq Nation, and Pabineau
Sickadomec First Nation Inc.
Wolastoqey Tribal Council — Kingsclear, Madawaska Maliseet, Oromocto, St. Mary's
The New Brunswick Aboriginal Peoples Council (NBAPC), though not a tribal council, represents 28,260 status and non-status Aboriginal People in New Brunswick.

Nova Scotia
Confederacy of Mainland Mi'kmaq — Acadia, Annapolis Valley, Bear River, Glooscap, Millbrook, Paqꞌtnkek, Pictou Landing, and Sipekneꞌkatik
Union of Nova Scotia Indians — Eskasoni, Membertou, Potlotek, Wagmatcook, and We'koqma'q

Prince Edward Island
Epekwitk Assembly of Councils — Abegweit and Lennox Island
Mi'kmaq Confederacy of Prince Edward Island
Pekwitk Assembly of Councils

Ontario

, Ontario has sixteen tribal councils:
Anishinabeg of Kabapikotawangag Resource Council
Bimose Tribal Council
Independent First Nations Alliance
Keewaytinook Okimakanak Council
Mamaweswen, The North Shore Tribal Council
Matawa First Nations Management
Mushkegowuk Council
Nokiiwin Tribal Council
Ogemawahj Tribal Council
Pwi-Di-Goo-Zing Ne-Yaa-Zhing Advisory Services
Shibogama First Nations Council
Southern First Nation Secretariat
United Chiefs & Councils of Mnidoo Mnising
Waabnoong Bemjiwang Association of First Nations
Wabun Tribal Council
Windigo First Nations Council

Quebec

, Quebec has seven tribal councils (First Nations listed in English):
Algonquin Anishinabeg Nation Tribal Council — Abitibiwinni, Kebaowek, Kitcisakik Anicinape, Kitigan Zibi Anishinabeg, Long Point, and Anishnabe Nation of Lac Simon
Algonquin Nation Programs and Services Secretariat — Algonquins of Barriere Lake, Timiskaming, and Wolf Lake
Atikamekw Sipi - Conseil de la Nation Atikamekw —Atikamekw of Manawan, Atikamekw of Opitciwan, and Wemotaci Atikamekw
Conseil Tribal Mamuitun — Innu Takuaikan Uashat Mak Mani-Utenam, Innue Essipit, Innu Nation of Matimekush-Lac John, Pessamit Innu, and Pekuakamiulnuatsh
Grand Conseil de la Nation Waban-Aki — Odanak and Wôlinak
Mi'gmawei Mawiomi Secretariat — Listuguj Mi'gmaq, Micmacs of Gesgapegiag, Micmacs of Gespeg
Regroupement Mamit Innuat — Innus of Ekuanitshit, Montagnais of Pakua Shipi, Montagnais of Unamen Shipu, and Innus of Nutashkuan
Grand Council of the Crees is not a tribal council in the same sense of the above, but serves a similar purpose. Its powers are not delegated from member communities but are derived from the 1975 James Bay and Northern Quebec Agreement and subsequent agreements with Canada and Quebec.

Saskatchewan

, Saskatchewan has nine tribal councils:
Agency Chiefs Tribal Council — Pelican Lake and Witchekan Lake
Battlefords Agency Tribal Council — Ahtahkakoop; Moosomin; Mosquito, Grizzly Bear's Head, Lean Man; Red Pheasant Cree; Saulteaux; and Sweetgrass
File Hills Qu'Appelle Tribal Council — Carry The Kettle, Little Black Bear, Muscowpetung, Nekaneet, Okanese, Pasqua, Peepeekisis 81, Piapot, Standing Buffalo, Star Blanket, and Wood Mountain
Meadow Lake Tribal Council (MLTC) — Birch Narrows, Buffalo River, Canoe Lake Cree, Clearwater River Dene, English River Dene, Flying Dust, Island Lake, Makwa Sahgaiehcan, and Waterhen Lake
Northwest Professional Services — Little Pine, Lucky Man, and Poundmaker
Prince Albert Grand Council — Black Lake Denesuline, Cumberland House, Fond du Lac Dene, Hatchet Lake Dene, James Smith, Lac La Ronge Indian Band, Montreal Lake, Peter Ballantyne Cree, Red Earth, Shoal Lake Cree, Sturgeon Lake, and Wahpeton Dakota
Saskatoon Tribal Council — Kinistin Saulteaux, Mistawasis Nêhiyawak, Muskeg Lake Cree, Muskoday, One Arrow, Whitecap Dakota, and Yellow Quill
Touchwood Agency Tribal Council — Day Star, George Gordon, Kawacatoose, and Muskowekwan
Yorkton Tribal Administration — Cote 366, Kahkewistahaw, Keeseekoose, Ocean Man, The Key, and Zagime Anishinabek

Yukon

, Yukon has two tribal councils:

 Council of Kaska Chiefs
 Southern Tutchone Tribal Council

References

External links
Tribal Councils of Saskatchewan